The Screen Award for Best Editing is chosen by a distinguished panel of judges from the Indian Bollywood film industry and the winners are announced in January.

Winners

1990s
1994 Hum Aapke Hain Kaun - Mukhtar Ahmed
1995 Haqeeqat - Kuldeep Mohan
1996 Is Raat Ki Subah Nahin - Renu Saluja
1997 Virasat - N. Gopalakrishnan
1998 Soldier - Hussain A. Burmawala
1999 Sarfarosh - Jeethu Mandal

2000s
2000 Kaho Naa... Pyaar Hai - Sanjay Varma
Hera Pheri - N. Gopalakrishnan
Josh - Zafar Sultan
Jungle - Chandan Arora
Khiladi 420 - Ratnakar Phadke
2001 Lagaan: Once Upon a Time in India - Ballu Saluja
Ajnabee - Hussain A. Burmawala
Aks - P.S. Bharathi
Bawandar - Jag Mundhra
Dil Chahta Hai - A. Sreekar Prasad
2002 Company - Chandan Arora
Devdas - Bela Segal
Humraaz - Hussain A. Burmawala
Kaante - Bunty Nagi
The Legend of Bhagat Singh - V.N. Mayekar
2003 Kal Ho Na Ho - Sanjay Sankla
Bhoot - Shimit Amin
Darna Mana Hai - Amit Parmar and Nipun Gupta
Munnabhai MBBS - Rajkumar Hirani
Waisa Bhi Hota Hai Part II - Neerav Ghosh
2004 Dhoom - Rameshwar S. Bhagat
Ab Tak Chappan - Murad Siddiqui
Ek Hasina Thi - Sanjib Datta
Musafir - Bunty Nagi
Yuva - A. Sreekar Prasad
2005 ...Yahaan - Shekhar
Apaharan - Santosh Mandal
Black - Bela Segal
Hazaaron Khwaishein Aisi - Catherine D'Hoir
Sarkar - Amit Parmar and Nipun Gupta
2006 Lage Raho Munnabhai - Rajkumar Hirani
Gangster - Akiv Ali
Rang De Basanti - P.S. Bharathi
Taxi No. 9211 - Aarif Sheikh
2007 Chak De! India - Amitabh Shukla
Black Friday - Aarti Bajaj
Johnny Gaddaar - Pooja Ladha Surti
Life In A... Metro - Akiv Ali
Shootout at Lokhandwala - Bunty Nagi
2008 Rock On!! - Deepa Bhatia
Aamir - Aarti Bajaj
Race - Hussain A. Burmawala
Sarkar Raj - Amit Parmar and Nipun Gupta
A Wednesday! - Shree Narayan Singh
2009 3 Idiots - Rajkumar Hirani
Dev D
Love Aaj Kal
Paa
Kaminey

2010s
2010 Band Baaja Baraat - Namrata Rao
Dabangg - Pranav Dhiwar
Love Sex Aur Dhokha - Namrata Rao
Ishqiya - Namrata Rao
Peepli Live - Hemanti Sarkar
Raajneeti - Santosh Mondal
2011 Delhi Belly - Hufeza Lokhandwala
No One Killed Jessica - Aarati Bajaj
Shaitan - Sreekar Prasad
Yeh Saali Zindagi - Archit D Rastogi
Zindagi Na Milegi Dobara - Anand Subaya
2013 Kai Po Che! - Deepa Bhatia
2014 Mardaani - Sanjib Datta
2016 Pink - Bodhaditya Banerjee
2019 War - Aarif Sheikh

See also
 Cinema of India

Screen Awards
Film editing awards